Piran waterfall or Rijab waterfall is the tallest waterfall in Iran, and is located in Sarpol-e Zahab County Kermanshah Province.

The height of Piran waterfall is about 100 meter.

References

Waterfalls of Iran